Riders of the Purple Sage is a 1996 American Western television film based on the novel by Zane Grey, directed by Charles Haid, adapted by Gil Dennis, and starring Ed Harris as Lassiter and Amy Madigan as Jane Withersteen.

Plot
A homesteader joins forces with a mysterious gunslinger to protect her land from a town that's turned against her.

Cast
Ed Harris as Jim Lassiter
Amy Madigan as Jane Withersteen
Henry Thomas as Bern Venters
Robin Tunney as Elizabeth "Bess" Erne
Norbert Weisser as Deacon Tull
G.D. Spradlin as Pastor Dyer

Production
This TNT Original Production is the fifth screen adaptation of Grey's novel across an eight-decade span.

Reception
Variety described the film as "moody" and saying that, "Charles Haid directs efficiently, with occasional moments of artiness — including filming a falling horse from several angles and cross-editing them, and action in a genuinely spooky thunderstorm."

References

External links
 Official Website
 

1996 television films
1996 films
1996 Western (genre) films
American Western (genre) television films
Films based on works by Zane Grey
Films based on American novels
Films shot in Utah
Films directed by Charles Haid
TNT Network original films
1990s English-language films